Le Lou-du-Lac (Gallo: Le Lóc) is a former commune in the Ille-et-Vilaine department in Brittany in northwestern France. On 1 January 2016, it was merged into the new commune La Chapelle-du-Lou-du-Lac.

Population

See also
Communes of the Ille-et-Vilaine department

References

External links

Former communes of Ille-et-Vilaine